Michael Horsburgh (born 15 January 1958) is a former Australian rules footballer who played with Collingwood in the Victorian Football League (VFL).

Horsburgh, a ruckman, played originally for Coleraine in the Western Border Football League (WBFL). In 1978 he finished second, on countback, in the league's best and fairest, but was retrospectively awarded the medal 24 years later. He made four appearances for Collingwood, early in the 1980 VFL season, then he returned to the WBFL, as playing coach of Casterton.

References

1958 births
Australian rules footballers from Victoria (Australia)
Collingwood Football Club players
Casterton Football Club players
Coleraine Football Club players
Living people